Madonna and Child with Four Saints and Donor is a 1507 oil on panel painting by Giovanni Bellini, measuring 90×145 cm and now in San Francesco della Vigna in Venice. It belongs to the sacra conversazione genre.

To the left are Saints John the Baptist and Francis of Assisi and to the right Saints Jerome and Saint Sebastian. It was probably originally part of the same altarpiece as Christ Crowned with Thorns, another part of which was given to Louis XII of France and is now in Stockholm.

References

1507 paintings
Paintings of the Madonna and Child by Giovanni Bellini
Paintings of the Madonna and Child
Paintings of Francis of Assisi
Paintings depicting John the Baptist
Paintings of Jerome
Altarpieces